São João do Tigre is a municipality in the state of Paraíba in the Northeast Region of Brazil.

Twin towns — sister cities

São João do Tigre is twinned with:

See also
List of municipalities in Paraíba

References

Municipalities in Paraíba